Colin J. Burdett (born 4 January 1931) is an Australian basketball player. He competed in the men's tournament at the 1956 Summer Olympics.

References

1931 births
Living people
Australian men's basketball players
Olympic basketball players of Australia
Basketball players at the 1956 Summer Olympics
Place of birth missing (living people)